Joseph Afusi (born 11 November 1982) is a Nigerian football coach and former player, who was most recently the Head coach of Bangladesh Premier League club Sheikh Jamal Dhanmondi Club.

Playing career

Early career
He played for Sheikh Jamal Dhanmondi Club, FC Baden, Zug 94, FC Solothurn, Ceahlăul Piatra Neamţ, CS Buftea, and Minerul Lupeni.

Honours

As a Player

FC Ceahlăul Piatra Neamț : Liga II
 
Winners (1):  2008–09
Sheikh Jamal Dhanmondi Club
 Bangladesh Premier League (1)
2010–11

As a Manager

Sheikh Jamal Dhanmondi Club
 Bangladesh Premier League (2)
 2013–14, 2014–15
 Federation Cup (1)
 2013-14

References

External links
 

1982 births
Living people
Nigerian footballers
Association football forwards
Ifeanyi Ubah F.C. players
Cypriot First Division players
AEL Limassol players
CS Chênois players
FC Baden players
FC Solothurn players
Liga II players
CSM Ceahlăul Piatra Neamț players
LPS HD Clinceni players
CS Minerul Lupeni players
Ramsgate F.C. players
Sheikh Jamal Dhanmondi Club players
Nigerian expatriate footballers
Expatriate footballers in Bangladesh
Expatriate footballers in Cyprus
Expatriate footballers in England
Expatriate footballers in Romania
Expatriate footballers in Switzerland
Nigerian expatriate sportspeople in Bangladesh
Nigerian expatriate sportspeople in Cyprus
Nigerian expatriate sportspeople in England
Nigerian expatriate sportspeople in Romania
Nigerian expatriate sportspeople in Switzerland